Jill Alison Emmerson (born 24 July 1942) is an Australian former tennis player from Sydney. She competed under her maiden name Jill Blackman until the late 1960s.

Emmerson was a singles quarter-finalist at the 1963 French Championships and 1964 Australian Championships. In 1966 she and Fay Toyne made the women's doubles final of the French Championships, which they lost in three sets to Margaret Smith and Judy Tegart. She made another grand slam doubles final in 1971 at the Australian Open, where she and partner Lesley Hunt were soundly beaten by Margaret Court and Evonne Goolagong.

Grand Slam finals

Doubles (2 runner-ups)

See also
List of Australian Open women's doubles finals
List of French Open women's doubles finals

References

External links
 

1942 births
Living people
Australian female tennis players
Tennis players from Sydney